Neuenburg may refer to:

Neuenburg am Rhein, a town in Baden-Württemberg, Germany
Neuenburg, part of Zetel in Lower Saxony, Germany
Neuenburg, part of Löffingen in Baden-Württemberg, Germany
Neuenburg, in Manitoba, Canada
Neuenburg Castle (Freyburg) in Saxony-Anhalt, Germany
Neuenbürg, a town in Baden-Württemberg, Germany
the German name for Neuchâtel, a city in Switzerland, also the canton and the lake
Neuenburg an der Elbe, the German name for Nymburk, a town in the Czech Republic
the German exonym for Jaunpils, a village in Latvia
 Neuenburg in Westpreußen, the German name for Nowe, a town in Świecie County, Kuyavian-Pomeranian Voivodeship, Poland